Thea Schnittke (born Taube/Toiba Katz —15 February 1889, Liepāja - 1970, Moscow) was a German Soviet writer and translator.

Life 
Taube Katz was born in Liepāja, Latvia, the daughter of Abram Meerovich Katz and Mina-Reizi Orelovna Kadyshevich. She married Viktor Schnittke with whom she moved to Frankfurt in 1910. Viktor and Thea (sometimes spelled Tea) were the grandparents of the composer Alfred Schnittke and his brother, also called  (1937—1994).

Works 

In 1920 Thea Schnittke had two texts published in Der Gegner:
 "Kommunismus und Tradition" (Communism and Tradition) Volume 1, Number 3, July 1920
 "Tolstoi der Denker" (Tolstoy the Thinker) Volume 1, Number 5, September 1920

References

1889 births
1970 deaths
Soviet Jews
Soviet people of German-Jewish descent
Linguists from Germany
Emigrants from the Russian Empire to Germany